Horst Frank (28 May 1929 – 25 May 1999) was a German film actor. He appeared in more than 100 films between 1955 and 1999. He was born in Lübeck, Germany and died in Heidelberg, Germany.

Selected filmography 

 Der Stern von Afrika (1957) – Albin Droste
  (1957) – Heyne
 The Copper (1958) – Josef Schmitz
 Rosemary (1958) – Student Michael Runge
 Blitzmädels an die Front (1958) – Gaston, ein Franzose
 The Girl from the Marsh Croft (1958) – Jan Lindgren
 Schwarze Nylons – Heiße Nächte (1958) – Sabri
 My Ninety Nine Brides (1958) – Jonny der Husar
 Stalingrad: Dogs, Do You Want to Live Forever? (1959) – Feldwebel Böse
 Wolves of the Deep (1959) – Lo Sposino
 The Head (1959) – Dr. Brandt – alias Dr. Ood
 Rebel Flight to Cuba (1959) – Richard Marshall
 The Cat Shows Her Claws (1960) – Le Major Von Hollwitz
  (Bumerang) (1960) – Willy Schneider
 Kein Engel ist so rein (1960) – Bubi Lausch
 Darkness Fell on Gotenhafen (1960) – Narrator (uncredited)
 Die zornigen jungen Männer (1960) – Dr. Gerd Schneider
 Le Bois des amants (1960) – Le colonel von Stauffen
  (1960) – Hauptmann Feder
 Tu ne tueras point (1961) – Adler
 Treibjagd auf ein Leben (1961) – Emil Frenzel
 Darling (1961) – Alberto – Albert
 Our House in Cameroon (1961) – Klaas Steensand
 Melody of Hate (1962) – Rasan
 The Hot Port of Hong Kong (1962) – Frank Marek
 Between Shanghai and St. Pauli (1962) – Frederic
 The Black Panther of Ratana (1963) – Jack Roller
 The White Spider (1963) – Kiddie Phelips
 Les Tontons flingueurs (1963) – Théo
 The Pirates of the Mississippi (1963) – Kelly
 Mission to Hell (1964) – Jack McLean
 Mystery of the Red Jungle (1964) – Robert Perkins
 Dead Woman from Beverly Hills (1964) – Manning / Dr. Steininger
 The Secret of the Chinese Carnation (1964) – Leutnant Legget
 Bullets Don't Argue (1964) – Billy Clayton
 Massacre at Marble City (1964) – Dan McCormick
 Black Eagle of Santa Fe (1965) – Blade Carpenter
 13 Days to Die (1965) – Perkins
 Red Dragon (1965) – Pereira
 Code Name: Jaguar (1965) – Karl
 Die letzten Drei der Albatros (1965) – Sven Broderson
 Blue Light (1966, Episode: "The Weapon Within" (1966) – Luber
 The Trap Snaps Shut at Midnight (1966) – Larry Link
 Diamond Safari (1966) – Fédérico
 Countdown to Doomsday (1966) – Dr. Soarez
 I Deal in Danger (1966) – Luber
 The Vengeance of Fu Manchu (1967) – Rudy Moss
 Dead Run (1967) – Manganne
 Desert Commandos (1967) – Lt. Roland Wolf
 A Handful of Heroes (1967) – Hauptmann Bruck
 Django, Prepare a Coffin (1968) – David Barry
 Johnny Hamlet (1968) – Claude Hamilton
 Hate Thy Neighbor (1968) – Chris Malone
 The Moment to Kill (1968) – Jason Forrester
 Le Paria (1969) – Rolf
 Marquis de Sade: Justine (1969) – Marquis de Bressac
 La porta del cannone (1969) – Müller, Gestapo
  (1969) – Duke Philippe
 Angels of the Street (1969) – Jule Nickels
 So Sweet... So Perverse (1969) – Klaus
 Frisch, fromm, fröhlich, frei (1970) – Waldemar Klingel
 Das Glöcklein unterm Himmelbett (1970) – Pater Guderim
 The Cat o' Nine Tails (1971) – Dr. Braun
 Und Jimmy ging zum Regenbogen (1971) – Karl Flemming
  (1971) – Heinrich Müller
 Jailbreak in Hamburg (1971) – Willy Jensen
 Carlos (1971) – Ligo
 The Dead Are Alive (1972) – Stephen
 Eye in the Labyrinth (1972) – Luca
 The Grand Duel (1972) – David Saxon / Patriarch Samuel Saxon
 Carambola! (1974) – Clydeson
  (1975) – Himmel – the Boss
 The Mimosa Wants to Blossom Too (1976) – Oberst Oschenko
 Albino (1976) – Whispering Death
  (1976) – Dominikaner
 Rosemary's Daughter (1976) – Heinrich "Mario" Schmitz
 Derrick (1976, Episode: "Auf eigene Faust") – Achim Schenke
  (1976, TV Mini-Series) – Freder Soermann / Soerman
  (1977) – Pepe Coronado
  (1977, TV Movie) – Mac
  (1979) – Hans Albert
 Timm Thaler (1979, TV Mini-Series) – Baron de Lefouet
  (1980) – Conrad Kolberg
 Derrick (1980, Episode: "Dem Mörder eine Kerze") – Pfarrer Scholz
 Flächenbrand (1981, TV Movie) – Lothar Steingruber
 Derrick (1983, Episode: "Die Tote in der Isar") – Robert Kabeck
 Mandara (1983, TV Mini-Series)
  (1983, TV Mini-Series)
 Catherine the Great (1995, TV Movie) – Schwerin
 Die Menschen sind kalt (1998) – Museumsdirektor

References

External links 

1929 births
1999 deaths
Actors from Lübeck
German male film actors
German male television actors
Male Spaghetti Western actors
20th-century German male actors